The International Journal of Reliability, Quality and Safety Engineering is a peer-reviewed scientific journal focusing on the areas of reliability, quality, and safety in engineering. It is published quarterly by World Scientific and is intended to "cover a broad spectrum of issues in manufacturing, computing, software, aerospace, control, nuclear systems, power systems, communication systems, and electronics". This includes articles on quality assurance and engineering, fuzzy logic, performance analysis of systems and critical systems design.

Abstracting and indexing 
The Journal is abstracted and indexed in:

 CSA Health and Safety Abstracts
 CSA Risk Abstracts
 CSA Aquatic Sciences and Fisheries Abstracts (ASFA)
 CSA Selected Water Resources Abstracts
 Chemical Abstracts
 EV2/Compendex

References 

Engineering journals
Publications established in 1994
World Scientific academic journals
English-language journals
Quarterly journals